Seda Demir (born 8 March 1983) is a Turkish television and movie actress. She rose to fame with her role in the TV series Yaprak Dökümü (2007–2010).

Career
Demir worked as a hostess in different fairs, and later registered at an acting agency with the encouragement of her friends. She was summoned for acting tests and short shootings several times, and for a while stopped showing up for the shootings. Her first job as an actress was in a commercial for Türkiye İş Bankası. She then started to appear in various commercials and advertisements. She made her TV debut with Yaprak Dökümü as Sedef.
 After the series' finale, in 2011 she played the role of Sude in the TV series Yıldız Masalı. She then returned to television in 2013 with a role in İntikam as Selen. This was followed by another role in the 2014 TV series Beyaz Karanfil as Elif. In 2015, she had her cinema debut with the movie Evlenmeden Olmaz and played the character of Ayşe.

Filmography

References

External links
 
 

Living people
1983 births
Turkish television actresses
Turkish film actresses
Actresses from Istanbul
Marmara University alumni
Turkish stage actresses